Ramsay may refer to:

People

 Ramsay (surname), people named Ramsay
 Clan Ramsay, a Scottish clan
 Richard Sorge (1895–1944), Soviet spy codenamed "Ramsay"

Places

Australia
 Ramsay, Queensland, a locality in the Toowoomba Region
 Ramsay, South Australia, a locality on the Yorke Peninsula
 Electoral district of Ramsay, South Australia

Canada
 Ramsay, Calgary, Alberta, a residential neighbourhood

United States
 Ramsay, Montana, a small settlement west of Butte
 Ramsay, an unincorporated community in Bessemer Township, Michigan
 Ramsay (Greenwood, Virginia), a historical estate

Moon
 Ramsay (crater), an impact crater

In fiction
 Ramsay Bolton, a character in the A Song of Ice and Fire series of fantasy novels by American author George R. R. Martin, and its television adaptation
 Ramsay family in the Australian soap opera Neighbours
 Henry Ramsay (Neighbours)
 Ramsay Street, a fictional street in the Australian soap opera Neighbours
 Cris Ramsay, a house pen name used by Aaron S. Rosenberg and others for tie-in novels for the television series Eureka

Other uses
 USS Ramsay (DD-124), a U.S. Navy destroyer in World War I
 Ramsay (publishing house), French publishing house, later acquired by Éditions Régine Deforges and Éditions Michel Lafon
 Ramsay Malware, a cyber espionage framework and toolkit

See also

 Ramsay principle, a rule in UK tax law
 Ramsay House (disambiguation)
 
 Ramsey (disambiguation)
 Ramzi, a masculine given name and surname